Attorney General Connolly may refer to:

Patrick Connolly (1927–2016), Attorney General of Ireland
Terry Connolly (1958–2007), Attorney-General of the Australian Capital Territory

See also
Edward Conolly (judge) (1822–1908), Attorney-General of New Zealand
William G. Conley (1866–1940), Attorney General of West Virginia